Hoshide (written: 星出) is a Japanese surname. Notable people with the surname include:

, Japanese astronaut
, Japanese footballer

See also
14926 Hoshide, a main-belt asteroid

Japanese-language surnames